The 7.5 mm Maschinengewehr 1951 or Mg 51 is a general-purpose machine gun manufactured by W+F of Switzerland. The weapon was introduced into Swiss service when the Swiss Army initiated a competition for a new service machine gun to replace the MG 11 heavy machine gun and the Furrer M25 light machine gun adopted in 1911 and 1925 respectively.

History
Around 1942 the Swiss army initiated a competition for a new service machine gun to replace both the “heavy” MG 11 and the “light” Lmg25, adopted in 1911 and 1925 respectively. According to the specifications of the Kriegstechnische Abteilung (KTA) (War Technology Department), the maximum cyclic rate of fire of 1,000 rounds per minute should not be exceeded. Three participants joined the competition–government-owned Waffenfabrik Bern, and privately owned factories SIG and Hispano-Suiza. Waffenfabrik Bern based its development on the hugely successful  World War II German MG 42 and its accessories.

The first prototypes emerged in around 1944, and looked much like MG 42, although the shape of receiver and butt was somewhat different. With all these prototypes, short shots were detected, which could not be tolerated, as the Swiss overshoot their own troops during live fire exercises. 

The final design, which appeared in 1950, was in most respects still similar to the MG 42, although many components were produced by machining instead of stamping, which increased the weight, the stability and the production costs of the machine gun. To prevent locking timing induced short shots problems, Waffenfabrik Bern changed the locking system from roller locking to flapper locking. These locking methods are similar in concept. The resulting weapon was in the light machine gun role  heavier than the German MG 42, and much more finely made and finished. 

The MG 51 served as a primary infantry and vehicle machine gun for Swiss army.
Since 2005 the MG 51 was gradually replaced in service with lighter and less expensive, but also less powerful 5.56mm FN Minimi machine gun of Belgian origin and manufacture.

Design details
The MG 51 is a short-recoil-operated, locked breech, air-cooled and automatic only, belt-fed weapon. It uses a locking system with a two-piece bolt and dual locking flaps located in the front part of the bolt. These flaps engage the cuts made in the short barrel extension to provide rigid locking. Upon recoil, the flaps are retracted toward the center of the bolt, to unlock it. An additional lever-type bolt accelerator is provided; it is located in receiver, next to the barrel breech and below the bolt. The gun housing also somewhat resembles the German MG 42, although it is made from two separate parts – the barrel jacket (made from stamped steel) and receiver (a solid machined body). The barrel jacket is permanently welded to the front of the receiver.

The barrel can be changed rapidly if required; the barrel change procedure is similar to that of the MG 42, with the locking latch located at the right side of the jacket, which is opened to provide a barrel replacement window.

The belt feed system is also similar to the MG 42, with single-stage cartridge feed that uses open-pocket steel belts (push-through type) and a two-stage belt pull (on both the opening and closing movement of the bolt). Feed is from the left side.
Ammunition boxes could hold up to 200 belted rounds. For the mobile role, 50-round belts can be loaded into drum-type containers, which are clipped to the side of the gun

For the light machine gun role a folding bipod is fitted to the barrel jacket. For the medium machine gun role (sustained or long range fire missions) a universal heavy tripod was developed.

Early production guns had wooden pistol grips and buttstocks; more modern guns have polymer furniture.

Variants 
Mg 51: Standard version
Mg 51/71: Version for vehicles like the Mowag Eagle or Pz 68
Mg 51/80: Version for fortifications 
Pz Mg 87: Coaxial version for the Pz 87 with electromagnetic trigger

The Pz Mg 51/71 is a vehicle-mounted variant for armoured vehicles like the MOWAG Eagle scout car. The Pz 55 and 57 (Centurion Mk 5/2 and Centurion Mk 7/2), Panzer 68 battle tanks and the Entp Pz 65 recovery tank all featured various Mg 51-based Pz Mg variants to fit as coaxial or pintle-mounted (anti-aircraft) machine guns.

The more modern Pz Mg 87 variant is used on the Pz 87 "Leopard 2" tank, with the only difference being an electromagnetic trigger, along with a switch allowing a 50% reduced fire rate, and a mount to fit inside the armour instead of the forward frame.

Gallery

Notice the tubular barrel protectors used as a field accessory.

See also
MG 42

Users
 chambered for .30-06 Springfield

References

External links

 W+F MG 51 Modern Firearms
 Modern Firearms - MG 51 machine gun
 http://www.plaenkler.ch/mg_51
 “Flapper Locking” Makes A Comeback in AA .338 Lapua 
 Flapper Locking Video

Machine guns of Switzerland
Medium machine guns
MG 42 derivatives
General-purpose machine guns
7.5×55mm Swiss firearms
Military equipment introduced in the 1950s